Pratap Simha (born 21 June 1976) is a Member of Parliament from the 17th Lok Sabha of India. He was also a member of 16th Lok Sabha of India. He was born in Sakleshpura, Hassan. He represents Mysore-Kodagu (Lok Sabha constituency)F of Karnataka and he is the Former President of Yuva Morcha Bharatiya Janata Party (BJP), Karnataka. He won the Mysore Lok Sabha seat in 2019 with a margin of 1.39 Lakh votes by defeating the Congress candidate. Also he is the only candidate in history of Mysore lok sabha constituency to secure more than 5 lakh votes in both 2014 and 2019 Lok Sabha elections.

Career

As journalist 
Simha joined the Kannada-language newspaper Vijaya Karnataka in 1999 as a trainee. He was later elevated as the editor and functioned under senior editor Vishweshwar Bhat during the time. He wrote his column under the title Bettale Jagattu (The Naked World) espousing Hindutva and being fiercely critical of anybody opposing it. Writing an article for the Outlook in 2014, he claimed that with his book Narendra Modi: Yaaru Thuliyada Haadi (Narendra Modi: The Untrodden Road) written in 2008, Simha "introduc[ed] Modi to Karnataka." Expressing his desire to contest from the Udupi Chikmagalur constituency as a member of the BJP in the 2014 general election, his candidature was accepted by the party, but was asked to contest from Mysore. Then a journalist with Kannada Prabha, Simha resigned in April 2014 before beginning his electoral campaign, and subsequently winning the seat. He summed up: "In 33 days, I had gone from columnist to parliamentarian."

As politician 

In June 2015, Simha was appointed as a member of the Press Council of India. As a politician and a Member of the Parliament (MP), Simha came to be known for his staunch stances in the promotion of Hindutva.

Controversies 

Simha's tenure as an MP was marked by several controversies. He was a vocal against government of Karnataka's birthday celebrations of Tipu Sultan starting 2015. He voiced that Sultan could be a "role model only for Islamists" and that the Chief Minister Siddaramaiah was "encouraging Jihadists" in the State. In 2017, against this backdrop, and police's prohibitory orders against taking procession of Hanuman Jayanti's organizers in Hunsur, a town in his constituency, Simha was arrested after he violated the prohibitory orders. In a widely circulated video, he was seen subsequently threatening the police officials and questioning their intent of "restricting" celebration of festivals of the Hindu faith, and barging through the barricade in his car.

In February 2017, Simha received criticism after he compared Gurmehar Kaur, a student of Delhi University who spoke against the Akhil Bharatiya Vidyarthi Parishad, a student body affiliated to the Rashtriya Swayamsevak Sangh.

Simha courted controversy again in November that year while making statements against actor Prakash Raj after the latter questioned Prime Minister Narendra Modi's silence following "certain killings" in the country. Simha had tweeted, "Being sad due to son's death, having left your wife and ran behind a dancer, Mr. Raj, do you have any right to say anything to Yogi, Modi". He was subsequently sent a legal notice to by Raj calling for an unconditional public apology, and that failing which he would "press criminal charges" against him. He agreed to Prakash raj comments and apologized publicly for his conduct

See also 
 List of members of the 17th Lok Sabha

References

Living people
Bharatiya Janata Party politicians from Karnataka
India MPs 2014–2019
Politicians from Mysore
Lok Sabha members from Karnataka
People from Hassan district
Journalists from Karnataka
1976 births
Recipients of the Rajyotsava Award 2011
India MPs 2019–present